This is a chronological list of Manchester City managers, comprising all those who have held the position of manager for the first team of Manchester City F.C. and the club's predecessors West Gorton (St. Marks) and Ardwick. In the Football League era the club has appointed 47 managers; including pre-league managers and temporary caretakers more than 40 men have held responsibility for team selection. Nine managers have won major silverware while managing the team.

The longest serving manager was Wilf Wild, who was in charge from 1932 to 1946, for a total length of 14 years 9 months. However, as Wild's tenure covered the entire length of the Second World War, in which no competitive football was played, he is not the man with the most games served as manager. Les McDowall, who was in charge from 1950 to 1963, a period of 13 years, managed the club for the most competitive games, a total of 592 games – a full 240 games more than Wild, who recorded the second most. 

The most successful Manchester City manager, as of 25 September 2021, is current head coach Pep Guardiola, who has won eleven trophies in six years from 2016 to 2022 and is the leading manager in terms of games won and percentage of games won.

History

Early years (1880s–1950s)

In the era before league football, the position of manager involved many secretarial duties, arranging fixtures and the upkeep of the club's ground. Few accounts of the club's off-field affairs in the 1880s survive, and it is unclear who managed the club (then known as West Gorton (St. Marks)) between 1882 and 1884. The club's earliest managers were also players; the first three known managers (Frederick Hopkinson, Edward Kitchen and Walter Chew) all played in West Gorton's first recorded match in 1880. By 1889 the club had moved to Hyde Road and renamed itself Ardwick A.F.C. Under the management of Lawrence Furniss, the club joined the Football League in 1892 as founder members of the Second Division. Furniss became chairman a year later, and he and his successor as secretary-manager Joshua Parlby were responsible for Ardwick reforming as Manchester City F.C. in 1894.

Under Sam Omerod the club achieved promotion to the First Division for the first time, and five years later Tom Maley became the first Manchester City manager to win a major trophy, the 1904 FA Cup. A financial scandal resulted in the Football Association suspending Maley and seventeen players in 1906, leaving Harry Newbould with the task of assembling a makeshift side at short notice. In 1912 Ernest Mangnall joined City from local rivals Manchester United, but was unable to replicate the success he had enjoyed with the Reds. Upon Mangnall's departure in 1924 the roles of secretary and manager were separated, with David Ashworth appointed manager and Wilf Wild as secretary. This arrangement continued during Peter Hodge's time as manager, though the roles merged again when Wild became manager in 1932. Wild became the club's longest serving manager, winning the FA Cup and League Championship during his fourteen-year tenure. By the time Sam Cowan replaced Wild the roles of secretary and manager were separated permanently. Cowan lasted only one season, and was replaced by Jock Thomson. He gained promotion, but did not make a lasting impact at the top level.

1960 to 2000

Les McDowall became manager in 1950, and managed the Blues for more league seasons than any other manager. Known for his tactical awareness, McDowall's implementation of a system known as the Revie Plan resulted in two FA Cup final appearances, a defeat in 1955 and a victory in 1956. McDowall resigned following relegation in 1963, and his assistant George Poyser became manager. Poyser proved unsuited to the manager's role, and was sacked in 1965. Joe Mercer was appointed, and the club's golden era began. Mercer became the club's most successful manager in terms of trophies won, winning the League Championship, the FA Cup, the League Cup and the European Cup Winners' Cup in his six years at the helm. Over time Mercer's assistant Malcolm Allison sought a progressively larger say in non-coaching matters, and in October 1971 he took sole control of the first team, with Mercer becoming "general manager".

During Peter Swales' time as Manchester City chairman the tenure of managers was frequently brief, as between 1973 and 1994 eleven managers were appointed. The first of these was Ron Saunders, after ill health had forced Johnny Hart to leave the post. Saunders was sacked after only six months, and club stalwart Tony Book took over. Book managed the club for five years, winning the League Cup in 1976. Malcolm Allison, who had rejoined the coaching staff in January 1979, made an ill-fated return to the manager's role later that year, a spell noted more for financial excess than on-pitch success. A further six managers (John Bond, John Benson, Billy McNeill, Jimmy Frizzell, Mel Machin and Howard Kendall) were appointed in the 1980s, with none lasting more than three years amid a series of promotions and relegations. An upturn in results occurred during Peter Reid's management, the club achieving consecutive fifth-place finishes, but a deterioration in Reid's relationship with the board signalled the end of his spell at the club. Brian Horton arrived from Oxford to sceptical newspaper headlines of "Brian Who?", but developed a reputation for attractive football. Swales was replaced as chairman by former City striker Francis Lee. Lee wanted to bring in his own man, and in the 1995 close season he replaced Horton with Alan Ball, whose sole full season resulted in relegation.

In the 1996–97 season, even the turnover rate of the Swales years was surpassed, with five managers (three permanent appointments and two caretakers) taking charge of first team affairs during the course of the season. The third of these was Steve Coppell, the shortest serving manager in the club's history, who resigned on ill health grounds after 32 days as manager. The final of the five, Frank Clark, saw out the season but did not last much longer, losing his job in February 1998 with the club on the brink of relegation to the third tier of English football. Joe Royle was unable to prevent relegation, but subsequently achieved successive promotions to restore top flight status, though relegation a year later resulted in his sacking.

2000 onwards, the Thaksin era and the Abu Dhabi era

Under Royle's replacement Kevin Keegan the club changed division for a fifth successive season, setting club records for the number of points gained and goals scored in a season. Keegan remained manager for the club's move to the City of Manchester Stadium and beyond, making him the longest serving manager since Tony Book.

On 6 July 2007, Sven-Göran Eriksson became the first non-British Manchester City manager, replacing the sacked Stuart Pearce, who had served for two years following an initial spell as caretaker.  After just one season with the club, Eriksson was replaced by Mark Hughes in June 2008. On 19 December 2009, Mark Hughes was sacked and replaced by Italian Roberto Mancini.

Mancini subsequently became one of the most successful managers of the club in the modern era, and the first to win major domestic trophies since the 1970s. However, after 3 and a half seasons in charge, Mancini was sacked on 13 May 2013 following defeat in the FA Cup Final versus Wigan Athletic.

On 14 June 2013, Manuel Pellegrini was confirmed as the new manager of the club after signing a 3-year contract and was the third manager, after Roberto Mancini and Brian Kidd (the latter as caretaker), to take charge of City under the ownership of ADUG.

On 1 February 2016, Pellegrini announced that, despite signing a contract extension at the beginning of the 2015–16 season, he would be leaving upon the conclusion of his third season as manager, with his contract ending as originally planned upon his arrival in 2013. He would depart having won the 2013–14 Premier League & two League Cups, in 2013–14 & 2015–16, and also guiding City to its first-ever Champions League semi-final in 2016.

On the same day that Pellegrini announced his planned departure, City announced that Pep Guardiola had agreed to succeed him as manager, with his tenure beginning on 1 July 2016. Despite a trophy-less first season in 2016–17, Guardiola would lead City to unprecedented success in the 2017–18 & 2018–19 seasons. In 2017–18, City won the Premier League with 100 points, setting countless records along the way whilst also winning the 2017–18 EFL Cup. The following season, the club became the first in the history of English football to complete the Domestic Treble by winning the Premier League, the FA Cup & the League Cup. Having won the 2018 FA Community Shield at the start of the season, City became the first team to win all four major English domestic honours in one season and to hold all four simultaneously. Guardiola has therefore become City's most successful manager in the club's history: winning 10 major English league and cup titles to date; and maintaining a win % in excess of 70%, at least 10% higher than any proceeding manager. On the European stage, Guardiola has taken City to a Champions League final, where they lost to Chelsea, for the first time in 2021, after three consecutive quarter-final exits (2018, 2019, 2020) and the round of 16 elimination in 2017.

Managers
As of match played 18 March 2023. Statistics include competitive matches only, pre-Football League and wartime matches excluded. Cup game losses or wins in a penalty shoot-out are counted as draws. Caretakers are shown in italics.

Most trophies won
As of 22 May 2022

References

Footnotes

 
Manchester City F.C.
Managers